VPMi is a cloud-based suite of Project Portfolio Management software used by companies to gain visibility into their project portfolio to manage schedules, budgets, scope, alignment with strategies, balanced scorecard, resources and documents.  The VPMi suite was created to help prevent miscommunication between business units and IT staff.  The VPMi suite originally comprised two software tools, VPMi Professional and VPMi Express, however, both of these applications have been merged into a new application simply called VPMi.  The application is developed by VCSonline, a company headquartered in Valley Park, just outside St. Louis, Missouri, with an additional office in Kolkata, India. VCSonline is mentioned in the 2015 Gartner Magic Quadrant for Cloud-Based IT Project and Portfolio Management Services, Worldwide.

History 
VCS online was co-founded in 1998 by Nick Matteucci and Jeff Pupillo, two former Ernst & Young project management consultants. The first version of VPMi Professional was released in 1998.  By 2003, the company had grown to 10 employees and a new worth of $1.3 million.  Version 3.0 introduced "online process maps that show where different projects are located in their life cycles." The latest release of VPMi, version 5.1.18686, was released in November, 2014.  The company currently employs a staff of 20.

Implementation Options
Like other web based project management software VPMi can be delivered as both a software, a service (SaaS) model as well as through a local implementation.  Currently, on every second friday of the month VSConline publishes patches and release updates for VPMi every month. Release Notes are made available on the Monday before the update is made available, and the User Guide is updated with new information by the official release date. These updates contain new features, bug fixes, and any other alterations made to the application.

VPMi's version number changed from 5.0.x to 5.1.x with the release of the Workplan Gantt Editor in January, 2014.

Version 5.1 Features 
Hybrid Forecasting: Added a new form of forecasting that combines team forecasting and workplan forecasting.
Modify ETC through Assignments: Added the ability to modify ETC directly from the assignments page.
Partial Time Period Lock: Added the ability to lock a time period partway through the week.  This does not submit time, but prevents time from being modified within the locked period.
People Audit: Tracks all changes to people, including roles.
Service Request Single Routing: Improved routing for Service Requests so that it can be done from a single page.
Time Audit: Tracks all changes to timesheets, allowing intensive auditing of time entry practices.
User Defined Fields: Added a large number of custom fields with a new interface to improve customization within the application.
Workplan Gantt Editor: Create Workplans via a browser with drag and drop simplicity.  Now includes critical path scheduling.

Features

Workplan Gantt Editor 
A prominent feature in version 5.1 is the workplan gantt editor.  This is a .NET tool powered by RadiantQ designed to streamline the project management process.  This improved the classic workplan management pages by reducing the need to reload pages and allowing a Project Manager to review the effects of their changes prior to saving them.

The editor contains two sides, a workplan side (see above) and a gantt side (see below).

Unlike previous implementations of the gantt in VPMi, the Workplan Gantt Editor lines up work-plan rows with gantt rows, making the relationships easier to see.

Dashboards 
VPMi has a variety of dashboards that quickly provide access to information at a glance.  These dashboards also link to full records within VPMi.  Currently, there are the following dashboards in VPMi:  My Home, My Resources, My Projects, My Organizations, My Reports, My Calendar, Organization, Project, and Program.

Project Management 
Projects can be managed entirely within VPMi, or through Microsoft Project (MSP) integration allowing Project Managers to upload and sync Microsoft Project Plans, managing their projects in a tool they may already be familiar with.  VPMi can also be used directly to manage workplans in a browser-based graphical user interface (GUI) called the Workplan Gantt Editor.  Once created, projects can be routed along a customizable Process Map. Additionally, VPMi has built in templating, allowing PMs to define a project as a template, then apply that template to new projects, populating them with the appropriate settings and workplan information.  Projects also have a Status, which indicates on a Red, Yellow or Green scale what state the project is in.  VPMi allows feedback to be requested from project team members.  Finally, projects can be prioritized so it is clear where resources should be dedicated first.

Workplan Management 
VPMi tracks three kinds of workplan items: Tasks, Deliverables, and Milestones.  These items can be tracked by client-defined phases, or by percentage complete.  Each of these items can have time tracked to it, and drive the financials of the projects and programs.

Log Item Tracking 
VPMi tracks five types of logs: Action Items, Change Requests, Risks, Issues, and Support Logs.  These items can be associated with Projects or Programs, and appear in a variety of reporting.  Each of these items can have time tracked to it, and appear in various reports.

Program Management 
Projects can be associated with programs, so that the metrics of several projects can be considered together in a larger context.  In addition, programs can have their own milestones, change requests, action items, issues, and risks.  Programs can also track financial metrics across the scope of many projects.  Like projects, they also have a Status, which indicates on a Red, Yellow, or Green scale what state the program is in.  VPMi allows feedback to be requested from program team members.

Reports 
VPMi offers a large number of pre-built reports that generate useful metrics about items within VPMi, all of which can be downloaded to a Microsoft Office format (Excel or Word).  In addition to these pre-built reports, VPMi offers the Ad Hoc Report Writer, which is a tool that allows users to create reports using a wide variety of data sources.  The User Documentation includes a tutorial on how to use the Ad Hoc Report Writer.

Time Tracking 
VPMi allows users to track time to any item through assignments and time tracking.  Time can be approved or rejected by specified users.  Time periods can be locked so no additional time can be tracked for that period.  Users can be designated as delegates to enter or approve time for other users.  Additionally, VPMi offers a wide variety of reporting based on this time entry data.

Financials and Forecasting 
VPMi tracks a variety of financial indicators, including labor costs, and offers three kinds of labor forecasting sources: workplan, team and resource plan.  VPMi breaks these down into labor and non-labor costs, breaking it out into actuals, planned, baselined and budgeted.   Additionally, VPMi can track and forecast expenses for projects.  Forecasts are updated based on time entry data.

User Management 
VPMi's user management tracks roles and skills for all users.  Skills are broken out into five levels, represent differing degrees of expertise.  A large number of user attributes can be managed, including email addresses, what organization they belong to, their manager, their start and end dates and billing and cost rates, among other attributes.

Other Features 
Search Filters: Filter pages allow you to disseminate information to make finding things easier.
Online Glossary: Extensive User Guide generated by HelpNDoc.
Document Management: VPMi allows the attaching of various document types to items, allowing them to be downloaded by other users.  It also offers a globally available set of documents called "Standards" linked through the top menu.
Calendars: Sync projects with in-app calendar.

See also
Project management software
List of project management software
Project Portfolio Management
Comparison of time tracking software

External links
VCSonline website
Additional VPMi Professional Information
Additional VPMi Express Information

References

"PM Network Case Study: VPMi.", PM Network July, 2007.

Project management software